The Untamed  is a 2019 Chinese television series adapted from the danmei novel Mo Dao Zu Shi by Mo Xiang Tong Xiu, starring Xiao Zhan and Wang Yibo. It follows the adventures of two soulmate cultivators who travel to solve a series of mysteries that link to a tragic event in the past.

The series aired in China on Tencent Video from 27 June to 20 August 2019 culminating with fifty episodes. A 20-episodes special edition of the drama aired on WeTV starting 25 December  2019. The brand and IP is belonging to NSMG (NewStyle Media Group).

The Untamed was a critical and commercial success, both locally and internationally, with critics praising its strong plot, well-rounded characters, and elaborate clothing and makeup. While the original web novel depicted an explicit romance between the two main male characters, the adaptation was censored with homoerotic subtexts instead due to China's ban of LGBT portrayals in films. It became one of the highest-earning dramas of 2019.

According to the "Research Report on China's Internet Audiovisual Development" for 2019 and the beginning of 2020, "The Untamed" ranked first in terms of popularity index. Due to the series' success, two spin-off movies focusing on the supporting characters have been released: Fatal Journey (2019), and The Living Dead (2019). The series passed 9.5 billion views on Tencent Video in June 2021, a few days before the second anniversary of its airing date, making it one of the highest-viewed Chinese dramas on the platform. A mobile game based on the series is also set to be released by NetEase Games.

Premise 
Wei Wuxian, a loathed cultivator of what some called "dark and demonic arts", is resurrected 16 years after his tragic death. His return to the world brings him to reunite with the people in his first life, including his soulmate, the honoured Lan Wangji. Wei Wuxian then begins to remember his time before his demise, from his beginning as a young cultivator using traditional tools like the sword and musical instruments, to his very personal methods of using resentful energy of departed beings, with the help of innovative tools of his own creation.

The scheming behind his tragic death is slowly unraveled, along with the mysterious death of other people he knew in his past life.

Synopsis 
16 years in the past when Wei Wuxian was a teenager and had visited the Gusu Lan Sect to take training, he met his soulmate Lan Wangji, the righteous, quiet natured man born of a noble family. Despite the two having different personalities, Lan Wangji and Wei Wuxian became good friends after experiencing many adventures and trials together. Wei Wuxian returned to his home after finishing his training at the Gusu Lan Sect, and a series of disastrous events made him give away his spiritual power to save the life of his martial brother, Jiang Cheng. The spiritually weak Wei Wuxian was tortured and thrown into the Burial Mounds by Wen Chao of Qishan Wen Sect, from where he returned after three months but as a man practicing demonic cultivation, which was considered a dark art. Lan Wangji tried to persuade him to give up practicing demonic cultivation but all in vain. As a result of his insistence to practice demonic cultivation, Wei Wuxian lost his reputation and was ostracized. Only Lan Wangji stood by him, trying every possible measure to stop him from being consumed by evil. During the battle at Nightless City, Wei Wuxian killed and harmed many of the disciples of other sects, and was responsible for the death of his martial sister Jiang Yanli.  Wei Wuxian committed suicide by jumping off a cliff, unable to be saved by Lan Wangji.

Back to the present time, Wei Wuxian was resurrected by Mo Xuanyu and was cursed to inhabit his body.  Despite inhabiting the body of Mo Xuanyu, Lan Wangji was nevertheless able to recognize him.  Both of them together solved mysteries that eventually led them to reveal what happened in the past.

Episodes 
The series aired every Thursday and Friday (GMT +08:00) with two episodes each, and VIP members could have early access to two more. On the first day of its release, a total of six episodes were available to VIP members. On June 30, 2019, their official Weibo released a new schedule and shifted the release from Monday to Wednesday. The series ended on August 20, 2019 with the 50th episode. On July 29, 2019 during an official fanmeeting event, they announced that VIP members would be able to watch all the episodes on August 7.

Cast

Main

Supporting

Gusu Lan Sect

Lanling Jin Sect

Qinghe Nie Sect

Qishan Wen Sect

Yunmeng Jiang Sect

Yi City Arc

Others

Production

Pre-production and filming 

Pre-production of the drama took two and a half years; including writing and modifying of the script, establishing the world view structure and art concept, as well as building of sets. The project was first announced in March 2018.

The series is co-directed by Zheng Weiwen and Chen Jialin; and the script written by a team consisting of Yang Xia, Deng Yaoyu, Ma Jing and Guo Guangyun. The main producers are credited to be Fang Feng, Yang Xia, Wang Chu and Liu Mingyi; while Yang Xia and Ji Peng serve as the art directors. The drama was filmed from April 2018 to August 2018 at Hengdian World Studios and Guizhou. Two weeks before filming, the cast gathered for script reading sessions and underwent martial arts and etiquette training.

Due to the censorship in China, all BL content is removed from the drama and changes are made to the overall plot. As the original novel was written in a "flashback" style, additional scenes had to be inserted to improve the flow of the story. 
Two versions of the script were prepared; one is told in the chronological order of story development, and the other is a narrative trajectory that follows the original novel. Finally, on the basis of not breaking the core of the original story, and to fully develop and layer the storyline, the team decided to adopt a mixture of both styles. To better fuse the different storylines together, the team decided to forgo traditional styles of filming, and more suspense was used in the lens composition settings.

Despite being termed as "xianxia" drama, The Untamed includes many elements of traditional wuxia dramas, fused with a new style. Using traditional wuxia values such as "chivalry and courage", it allows the younger audience to better relate to the drama.

Casting 
The casting director gave a special "character card" to each of the cast members; which includes detailed descriptions of the character such as the looks, height, clothing style and even specific details such as "Wei Wuxian has a natural smiling face".

Xiao Zhan and Wang Yibo were announced as the lead actors in April 2018. Xiao Zhan was recommended by a friend of the producer Yang Xia, who chose him because of his "clean gaze". Wang Yibo got the role through an audition. By judging from his acting portfolio, the producers had overlooked him for the role of Lan WangJi at first until they met him in the flesh. They thought that this youngster was probably too immature  to portray the refined and sophisticated Lan Er Gongzi, but as soon as he walked into the studio the producers knew that they'd just found the most ethereal and sought-after character of the series. They said he had the cool and aloof aura of Lan Wangji from the moment he stepped into the casting room.

Lu Zhixing, who dubbed Wei Wuxian in the audio drama, and Bian Jiang, who dubbed Lan Wangji in the donghua adaptation of Mo Dao Zu Shi, were hired to voice Wei Wuxian and Lan Wangji in the series.

Design and concept
According to producer Yang Xia, while designing the sets and costumes of the different sects, the team started out by searching for a culture placement where the design could be based on. The costume designer of the drama is Chen Tongxun.

For the Gusu Lan sect, influence from the Song Dynasty were taken into consideration while designing the costumes and sets. While designing the "Jingshi", blue and green shades were used to showcase the elegance and dignified strength/character of the sect; while darker shades of wood were used to show off the magnificence. Cascading collars and sleeves were used to design the clothes, to highlight the strictness of the sect.

For the Yunmeng Jiang sect, influences from the Hubei and Jianghan district were taken. Warm and light colors were used to showcase the cheerful and free-spirited nature of the sect. The architecture and sets were designed to be widely spaced, and yarn was used to create the feeling of "transparency". Narrow sleeves and neat designs were used to highlight the "wandering pugilistic" feel of the sect. A water recycling device was used in the lotus lake of the set, allowing ripples to be seen on the lake surface. A special ceiling was built for the ancestral hall.

For the Qinghe Nie sect, the set was designed to be surrounded by high walls and the entrance isn't easily seen because it was often invaded by Qishan Wen sect. For Qishan Wen sect, designs from the Shang dynasty were used. For Lanling Jin sect, the designs were inspired by the luxurious and elegance of the Tang dynasty.

Controversies
A fire broke out on July 11, 2018 while the cast and crew were filming in Nanma, Dongyang, at a facility that belongs to Hengdian World Studios. The fire reportedly spread as wide as 300 square meters, and resulted in the death of two crew members.

During filming, a rumor surfaced that the producers of the drama had replaced Lan WangJi as Wei Wuxian’s love interest with a female character, Wen Qing, and also made Mianmian, who shares a fun, flirty relationship with Wei Wuxian and a respectful, protective relationship with Lan Wangji, into a member of Jin clan. This rumor caused significant backlash amongst fans of the original novel. The production team strongly denied such claims.

In July 2019, Tencent announced that VIP users would have the option of paying to watch episodes that had not yet aired. From August 7, the final episode would be released early for some viewers who chose to avail of the option. This caused outrage among viewers of the show, who were concerned that it would risk the ending being spoiled and also the possibility that the episodes would be pirated, which would have a negative effect on views. In response, Tencent explained that in this way they could cater to demands of certain viewers who were asking for episodes to be released faster, while others could still watch the series at their preferred pace.

Soundtrack
The main composer of the soundtrack is Lin Hai. The theme song was titled "忘羡" before being renamed from Episode 11 onwards to "无羁". On July 8, 2019, the digital album was released on QQ Music along with full version of the song as well as other character songs. The instrumental album was released on QQ Music on August 5, 2019.

The physical album was released on November 2, 2019.

On August 19, QQ Music announced that the sales for the soundtrack album had broken 15.000.000 yuan, officially attaining the platinum certification. As of September 2019, the album was the highest-selling soundtrack album on the platform, and ranked #15 on the list of highest-selling digital album.

Reception
The series has accumulated a total of 10 billion views on Tencent Video, as of December 2021. One of the major reasons for the series' popularity is its faithfulness to the original novel. It was praised by People's Daily for its "wonderful presentation of Chinese characteristics"; showcasing traditional cultural elements through exquisite costumes, traditional Chinese music instruments; as well as transmitting positive values such as courage, chivalry and love for one's country. China News Service similarly highlighted the exquisite costumes and showcase of traditional etiquette, while also praising the suspenseful plot and well-connected storyline. Wang Yibo was initially criticized by viewers for his blank acting style in the first few episodes, which he later improved upon with the help of director's instructions. Moreover, the great number of female audiences of the series formed their collective identity as The Untamed Girls to participate promoting this web drama on various Chinese social media platforms.

The show has also garnered significant exposure and popularity globally for its strong plot, well-rounded characters, and elaborate clothing, makeup and stage production. Film Daily described the drama as a "Global Phenomenon," and credited it for contributing to the increased presence and popularity of Asian content on popular streaming sites such as Netflix. The heroic story with modern values was said to have struck a chord globally, and helps promotes Chinese style and traditional culture to the world, leading to a wave of interest in Chinese dramas.

Economic effect
The Untamed was one of the highest-earning dramas of 2019, bringing in earnings from fan meetings, concerts, album sales and merchandises.

As Tencent VIP members are allowed watch the final episodes of the show in advance, more than 2.6 million new subscribers paid to unlock the function, generating more than 78 million yuan in profit. More than 1.6 million copies of the soundtrack album were sold on Tencent Music. In addition, a merchandise store was opened in Taobao and official merchandise was sold, with earnings amounting to 1.17 million yuan. Other source of earnings include paying to unlock the full music video of "Unrestrained" in advance, as well as the Bazaar Magazine featuring both lead actors Xiao Zhan and Wang Yibo which sold more than 330,000 copies within three days, before exceeding 1.1 million copies.

For the fan meetings, a special system was introduced by Tencent, where VIP members have to accumulate "star points" to get a better chance to get tickets to the fan meetings and concerts. More than 3.27 million viewers paid between 30 to 50 yuan to view the live broadcast of The Untamed National Style Concert on Tencent Video. It is estimated that the platform has earned more than 100 million yuan in revenue from that concert alone. Tickets of the concert were sold-out in less than 5 seconds, and leftover tickets were also marked up to 150,000 yuan by ticket scalpers from the original price of 627 yuan.

In overseas markets, Tencent announced in October 2019 that The Untamed had boosted WeTV's growth by 250 percent with an average of 1 million application downloads per month since the drama was first launched in June.

Responding to the demand of sold-out fan meetings in Thailand and China, in January 2020, the cast members planned to embark on a multi-city worldwide fan meetings tour. Cities included Bangkok, Singapore, Ho Chi Minh City, Tokyo, Seoul, Macau, Kuala Lumpur, Toronto, Los Angeles, New York, but was cancelled after the Bangkok concert due to the recent pandemic.

Awards and nominations

Promotion

Thailand Fanmeeting
The fanmeeting was held in Bangkok at Impact Arena on September 21, 2019 and was attended by 9,000 fans.
The proceeds of the Thailand fanmeeting were donated to the people of Ubon Ratchathani Province, which had been hit by floods.

The Untamed National Style Concert
The concert was held from November 1 and 2, 2019 at Nanjing Qing'ao Sports Park with a capacity of 20,000 seats. Tan Yizhe served as the music executive of the concert, while Yuan Jing served as the creative director. Ticket prices were sold at 627 yuan and 1980 yuan, to commemorate the first day of broadcast and the last day of filming of The Untamed respectively. 16 songs were sung in the concert, along with a segment for interactions and games. Prior to purchasing tickets on Maoyan, fans had to answer a questionnaire based on the show. Viewers were able to live-stream the concert via Tencent Video, with a fee of 30 to 50 yuan.

Mobile game
A mobile gamed based on The Untamed is set to be released via NetEase.

The Untamed Boys
The six-membered group named "The Untamed Boys", also known as T.U.B.S., which consists of Yu Bin, Ji Li, Cao Yuchen, Zheng Fanxing, Song Jiyang & Li Bowen, first made their appearance in The Untamed National Style Concert performing the song "Fearless". They subsequently appeared in T Mall 11/11 Shopping Festival, performing the song "Fairytale"; as well as featured in Elle Men's New Youth magazine. They appeared in the variety show Youths Learning In Progress, which aired on Tencent Video starting December 5, 2019. On January 7, 2021, Zheng Fanxing and Song Jiyang announced their departure from the group due to busy schedules and pursuing their solo careers in acting.

International broadcast

Spin-off films
Two straight to streaming spin-off films, neither featuring the main cast members, have been released, which serve as side stories to the television series.

The Living Dead (2019) 
The Living Dead was released on November 7, 2019. The movie focuses on the characters of Wen Ning and Lan Sizhui.

Synopsis 
Near Qishan Mountain, there is a little town called Fu Feng, which is nicknamed the "City That Never Turns Dark". This city is home to the legend of the "Lit Lamp Murderer". Wen Ning arrives at Fu Feng and realizes the abnormality of the town. The whole town is filled with only the weak and sick; and is very run down. When the night arrives, Wen Ning lights up a lamp to attract ghost shadows. Just as he is about to capture them, a ray of blue sword light appears and the black shadow disappears. Wen Ning looks up and sees his nephew, Lan Sizhui. Wen Ning and Lan Sizhui decide to work together and solve the mystery to capture the culprit behind the mysterious incidents.

Cast
 Yu Bin as Wen Ning 
 Zheng Fan Xing as Lan Sizhui 
 Wang Yifei as Xiao Qing
 Gao Han as Xiao Yi
 He Longlong as Zhou Zishu

Fatal Journey (2019) 
Fatal Journey focuses on the story of the Qinghe Nie brothers and Jin Guangyao.

Synopsis

The Qinghe Nie sect finds itself dealing with problems of its ancestral tomb of swords. Nie Mingjue takes his brother, Nie Huaisang, to restore the tomb to its original state and ensure peace in the Nie sect.

Through this, Huaisang goes from being a playful disciple and after preparing, he becomes the sect leader of the next generation and Mingjue learns, understands his brother more and helps him grow.

Cast
 Ji Li as Nie Huaisang
 Wang Yizhou as Nie Mingjue
 Zhu Zanjin as Jin Guangyao
He Xiang (何翔) as Nie Zonghui
Rao Guo Feng (饶国锋) as Qinghe Nie Sect Disciple
Xuan Yue Wen (宣粤文) as Nie Mingjue [Young]
Xu Wai Luo (徐崴罗) as Nie Huaisang [Young]
Zhou Lu (周路) as Cuo Zei

References

External links 
 
 The Untamed at Tencent Video's official YouTube channel

Television shows based on Chinese novels
Xianxia television series
2019 web series debuts
Chinese web series
Tencent original programming
Chinese boys' love television series
2019 Chinese television series debuts
2019 Chinese television series endings
Television series by Tencent Penguin Pictures
Fantasy web series